Epipagis tristalis is a small moth in the family Crambidae that is found in Papua New Guinea. It was described by George Hamilton Kenrick in 1907 based on insects collected by Antwerp Edgar Pratt. Pratt wrote Two Years among New Guinea Cannibals based on his time there.

It has a wingspan of 24 mm.

Subspecies
Epipagis tristalis tristalis Kenrick, 1907
Epipagis tristalis minor Rothschild, 1916

References

External links

Moths described in 1907
Spilomelinae